Tedd Arnold (born January 20, 1949 in Elmira, New York, United States) is a children's book writer and illustrator. He has written and illustrated over 100 books, and he has won the Theodor Seuss Geisel Honor for his books "Hi! Fly Guy!" (2006), "I Spy Fly Guy" (2010), and "Noodleheads See the Future" (2018). He currently lives outside of Gainesville, Florida.

Background
Tedd graduated from the University of Florida with a BFA. He worked as a commercial illustrator before beginning his career writing children's books. Arnold met his wife, Carol, while living in Florida. Carol, a former kindergarten teacher, encouraged him to write and illustrate children's books. His sons, Walter and William, served as the inspiration for some of his characters and stories.

List of series
Fly Guy - Focusing on a friendly fly named Fly Guy and his owner Buzz.
Huggly (The Monster Under the Bed) - Focusing on the adventures of Huggly, a cute and pudgy green monster with a yellow belly, living under the people child's bed with the help of his best friends Booter and Grubble.
Parts - Focusing on an inquisitive boy named Chip Block and body parts.

Characters

Main characters
 Fly Guy - A brown fly who is the main character of the Fly Guy series. 
 Buzz - A young boy who is Fly Guy's owner.
 Chip Block - The main character of Parts series.
 Huggly - A cute and pudgy male green monster, the main character of The Monster Under the Bed series, with dark teal scales on his back, orange spots and a yellow tummy. He's shy and quiet, and can be somewhat klutzy. His belly is slightly bigger than Grubble's is. In the PC games, his tummy is lime. He was born on June 17.
 Booter - A purple monster who is Huggly's female best friend with light purple scales, red stripes and a yellow tummy. In the PC games, her tummy is orange while her stripes are orange and her scales are blue. She is very sweet like Huggly and sometimes hyper. She was born on January 9.
 Grubble - An orange monster who is Huggly's male best friend with magenta hair and spots and a yellow tummy. In the PC games, his hair and spots are red. He is also occasionally nervous and vain. He was born on September 28.

Other characters
 People Child - A young boy who lives in Huggly's bedroom.
 People Mother - The People Child's mother.
 People Father - The People Child's father.
 Grandma - Buzz's grandmother in the Fly Guy series.

Awards
Tedd's first book, No Jumping on the Bed! was an IRA-CBC Children's Choice book and was also selected as a Parents Magazine 50 All-Time Best Children's Book. He is a three-time winner of the ALA's Theodor Seuss Geisel Honor for Hi! Fly Guy and for I Spy Fly Guy, and Noodleheads See the Future

Novels for older teens
Rat Life (Edgar Award for Best Young Adult Novel, 2008)

Children's books written and illustrated by Tedd Arnold
 future Human Hunting (TBA) about Yeti who tries to Track, Find, Search, Look. and Hunt the Human to Prove his City (populated by Yetis) - This will be adaptated into Paramount Animation's LittleFoot (also written a Screenplay)
 Noodlehead Nightmares (2016)
Noodleheads See the Future (2017) - 2018 Theodor Seuss Geisel Award Honor Book
Noodleheads Find Something Fishy (2018)
Noodleheads Fortress of Doom (2019)
Why Fly Guy? (2017)
Dirty Gert
Fix This Mess
Vincent Paints His House
Parts
 More Parts
 Even More Parts
 Hi! Fly Guy (2005) - 2006 Theodor Seuss Geisel Award Honor Book
 Super Fly Guy (2006)
 Shoo, Fly Guy! (2006)
 There Was An Old Lady Who Swallowed Fly Guy (2007)
 Fly High, Fly Guy (2008)
 Hooray for Fly Guy (2008)
 I Spy Fly Guy (2009) - 2010 Theodor Seuss Geisel Award Honor Book
 Fly Guy Meets Fly Girl
 Buzz Boy and Fly Guy (2010)
 Fly Guy vs. the Flyswatter
 Ride, Fly Guy, Ride
 There's a Fly Guy in my Soup
 Fly Guy and the Frankenfly
 Fly Guy's Amazing Tricks
 A Pet for Fly Guy
 Prince Fly Guy
 Fly Guy's Ninja Christmas
Fly Guy's Big Family
Fly Guy and the Aliens
Attack of the 50 Foot Fly Guy
Fly Guy Presents: Sharks
 Fly Guy Presents: Space
 Fly Guy Presents: Dinosaurs
 Fly Guy Presents: Firefighters
 Fly Guy Presents: Insects
 Fly Guy Presents: Bats
 Fly Guy Presents: Snakes
 Fly Guy Presents: The White House (2016)
 Fly Guy Presents: Weather (2016)
Fly Guy Presents Castles
Fly Guy Presents Police
Fly Guy Presents Garbage (2019)
Fly Guy Presents Monster Trucks (2019)
 Huggly Goes to School
 Huggly's Big Mess
 Huggly Gets Dressed
 Huggly's Pizza
 Huggly's Trip to the Beach
 Huggly's Snow Day
 Huggly Goes Camping
 Huggly Takes a Bath
 Huggly's Halloween
 Huggly's Thanksgiving Parade
 Huggly and the Toy Monster
 Huggly's Christmas
 Huggly's Sleep Over
 Huggly's Valentines
 Bialosky's Bedside Books—a collection of the following books:
 Bialosky's Bedtime
 Bialosky's House
 Bialosky's Bumblebees
 Bialosky's Big Mess
 The Simple People
 No More Water in the Tub!
 The Signmaker's Assistant
 Five Ugly Monsters
 Green Wilma
 Green Wilma, Frog in Space
 Catalina Magdalena Hoopensteiner Wallendiner Hogan Logan Bogan Was Her Name
 The Twin Princes
 No Jumping on the Bed! (1987)
 My First Drawing Book
 Help I'm Falling to Bits
 My First Play House
 My First Play Town
 Sounds
 Opposites
 Actions
 Colors
 Ollie Forgot
 Mother Goose's Words of Wit and Wisdom

Illustrator, or collaboration only
Detective Blue by Steve Metzger
The Yuckiest, Stinkiest, Best Valentine Ever by Brenda Ferber
Axle Annie and the Speed Grump by Robin Pulver
 Lasso Lou and Cowboy McCoy by Barbara Larmon Failing
 My Dog Never Says Please by Suzanne Williams
 Giant Children by Brod Bagert
 My Working Mom by Peter Glassman
 Looking for Zebra: Hotel Zoo: Happy Hunting from A to Z by Ron Atlas
 Inside a House That Is Haunted by Alyssa Capucilli
 Tracks by David Galef
 My First Gamebook by Katy Dobbs
 My First Baking Book by Rena Coyle
 My First Computer Book by David Schiller, David Rosenbloom
 My First Camera Book by Anne Kostick
 Inside a Zoo in the City by Alyssa Satin Capucilli
 The Roly Poly Spider by Jill Sardegna
 Inside a Barn in the Country: A Rebus Read-Along Story by Alyssa Satin Capucilli
 Why Did the Chicken Cross the Road? Harry Bliss, David Catrow, Marla Frazee, Jerry Pinkney, Chris Raschka, Judy Schachner, David Shannon, Mo Willems Jon Agee
Manners Mash-Up
 Dinosaur Dig: Cooperative Game-In-A Book by Liza Schafer, Vincent Ceci, Jacqueline Swensen
 Guys Write For Guys Read by Jon Scieszka

PC games
Huggly's Sleepover: I'm Ready for Kindergarten (October 4, 1996) 
Huggly Saves the Turtles: Thinking Adventures (July 8, 2000)

Trivia
In the PC Games, Huggly's belly is lime instead of yellow while Booter's is orange as well as her stripes, and Grubble's hair and spots are red.
Booter is the only female monster in The Monster Under the Bed series.

References

Keller, James, The Big Book of Picture-Book Authors & Illustrators, Scholastic, 2001, pp. 10–11. 
McElmeel, Sharron L., Children's Authors and Illustrators Too Good to Miss: Biographical Sketches and Bibliographies, Libraries Unlimited, 2004, pp. 6–10. 
"Tedd Arnold." Children's Authors. Answers Corporation, 2006. Accessed 25 September 2008,
Biography: Tedd Arnold, Scholastic Corporation. Accessed 25 September 2008

External links

 
 

Living people
1949 births
American children's book illustrators
American children's writers
21st-century American novelists
Edgar Award winners
American male novelists
21st-century American male writers